The ischial tuberosity (or tuberosity of the ischium, tuber ischiadicum), also known colloquially as the sit bones or sitz bones, or as a pair the sitting bones, is a large swelling posteriorly on the superior ramus of the ischium. It marks the lateral boundary of the pelvic outlet.

When sitting, the weight is frequently placed upon the ischial tuberosity.  The gluteus maximus provides cover in the upright posture, but leaves it free in the seated position. The distance between a cyclist's ischial tuberosities is one of the factors in the choice of a bicycle saddle.

Divisions
The tuberosity is divided into two portions: a lower, rough, somewhat triangular part, and an upper, smooth, quadrilateral portion.
 The lower portion is subdivided by a prominent longitudinal ridge, passing from base to apex, into two parts:
 The outer gives attachment to the adductor magnus
 The inner to the sacrotuberous ligament
 The upper portion is subdivided into two areas by an oblique ridge, which runs downward and outward:
 From the upper and outer area the semimembranosus arises
 From the lower and inner, the long head of the biceps femoris and the semitendinosus

Additional images

See also
 Ischial bursitis 
 Sitting disability

Notes

References

External links
 

Bones of the pelvis
Ischium